Thomas Luttrell (1583–1644) was an English politician from Dunster Castle in Somerset.  In 1625 he sat in the Useless Parliament as a Member of Parliament (MP) for his family's pocket borough of Minehead.

Thomas Luttrell was the oldest son of George Luttrell of Dunster Castle and was baptized on 26 Feb 1583. He was educated at Lincoln College, Oxford and at Lincoln's Inn. He had inherited seven manors in north-west Somerset, and held numerous public offices in the county including Deputy Lieutenant from 1629 to at least 1640, and Sheriff in 1631–32.

Thomas Luttrell married Jane Popham, daughter of Sir Francis Popham and his wife Ann Dudley, on 15 May 1621 in Stoke Newington St Mary Parish, Hackney District, Middlesex, England.

Their children:
 George Luttrell, died 1655.
 Alexander Luttrell, baptized 01 Mar 1622.
 Thomas Luttrell, baptized 08 Mar 1627, died 2 Apr 1627.
 Francis Luttrell, baptized 01 Nov 1628, buried 14 Mar 1665.
 Amye Luttrell, baptized 26 Jun 1629.

See also 
 Feudal barony of Dunster

References 
 

1583 births
1644 deaths
Thomas
English MPs 1625
Alumni of Lincoln College, Oxford
Members of Lincoln's Inn
Deputy Lieutenants of Somerset
High Sheriffs of Somerset